San Clemente State Beach is a public beach located in the south end of the city of San Clemente, California, United States. Located halfway between Los Angeles and San Diego, it has been the most popular beach in the state since 1937.

Significant numbers of visitors are attracted to this beach due to its intense winds and dramatic location. The majority of the visitors are water sports enthusiasts and those who wish to escape from the inland heat and nearby metropolitan areas for the day.

See also
List of beaches in California
List of California state parks

References

External links
official San Clemente State Beach website

Beaches of Southern California
California State Reserves
California State Beaches
State parks of California
Parks in Orange County, California
Beaches of Orange County, California
Geography in San Clemente, California